Graphic Arts Building may refer to:

 Graphic Arts Building (Kansas City, Missouri), listed on the National Register of Historic Places (NRHP) in Missouri
 Graphic Arts Building (Dayton, Ohio), listed on the NRHP in Ohio
 Graphic Arts Building (Toronto), still standing
 Graphic Art Building (Toronto), demolished, was at the Canadian National Exhibition